Laplace's law or The law of Laplace may refer to several concepts,
 Biot–Savart law, in electromagnetics, it describes the magnetic field set up by a steady current density.
 Young–Laplace equation, describing pressure difference over an interface in fluid mechanics.
 Rule of succession, a smoothing technique accounting for unseen data.